Quest of the Dream Warrior is an album by David Arkenstone, released in 1995. It is the second album in a trilogy that begins with In the Wake of the Wind and concludes with Return of the Guardians. The album is based on a fantasy story by Arkenstone and Mercedes Lackey that appears in the booklet. The album also comes with a fold-out map of the world in which the story is set. Three tracks contain vocals by Arkenstone: "Prelude: Tallis the Messenger", "The Voice" and "Road to the Sea". As with many David Arkenstone albums, the music often has an epic, cinematic feel and blends new age, rock and world music elements.

Track listing
"Prelude: Tallis the Messenger" – 6:18
"Rhythms of Vision" – 4:44
"The Journey Begins: Kyla's Ride" – 5:21
"The Voice" – 5:02
"Dance of the Maidens" – 4:28
"The Magic Forest" – 5:25
"Road to the Sea" – 6:01
"The Temple of Vaal" – 5:36
"Wings of the Shadow" – 5:26
"Homecoming" – 4:23
 All tracks composed by David Arkenstone

Personnel
 David Arkenstone – acoustic and electric guitars, lead and backing vocals, keyboards, programming, flute, pennywhistle, piano, Hammond organ
 Dan Chase – drums, percussion, programming
 Kyf Brewer – backing vocals
 Rory Dodd – backing vocals
 Diane Hanson – additional vocals
 David Weiss – Chinese flutes, recorder, flute, piccolo
 Minoko Yajima – violin
 Michael Whalen – Synclavier, keyboards
 Wayne Lothian – 6-string bass
 Russ Rizner – French horn
 Melanie Feld – oboe, English horn
 Masako Yanagito, Yong Kim, Ann Labin, Ann Leathers – violins
 Carol Landon, Maryhelen Ewing – violas
 Eugene Moye, Lanny Paykin – cellos
 Orchestrations by Leland Bond, David Arkenstone and Michael Whalen

References

1995 albums
David Arkenstone albums
Narada Productions albums